Beaufort Taylor Watts (April 10, 1789 – 1869) was an American diplomat and politician from South Carolina.  He served as the Secretary of the U.S. Legation to Colombia from 1824–26, United States Ambassador to Colombia (technically he was Chargé d'affaires) from 1826–27, and Secretary of Legation to Russia from 1828–29.  He then served as secretary to the Governor of South Carolina from 1834 to 1861.  He also served as a representative in the South Carolina General Assembly.

Watts was born in or near Laurens, South Carolina in 1789 to Captain John and Margaret Martha (Pollard) Watts, and graduated from South Carolina College in 1812.

References

1789 births
1869 deaths
Members of the South Carolina House of Representatives
University of South Carolina alumni
19th-century American diplomats
19th-century American politicians